Jeremy Stuart Hernandez (born July 6, 1966) is an American former Major League Baseball pitcher. Hernandez, who is of Mexican descent, played in five seasons in the major leagues, from  until . During that time, he pitched in 133 games, all in relief.

References

External links

Major League Baseball pitchers
San Diego Padres players
Cal State Northridge Matadors baseball players
Cleveland Indians players
Florida Marlins players
Erie Cardinals players
Springfield Cardinals players
Charleston Rainbows players
Riverside Red Wave players
St. Petersburg Cardinals players
Wichita Wranglers players
Las Vegas Stars (baseball) players
Brevard County Manatees players
Charlotte Knights players
Visalia Oaks players
Chico Heat players
Tri-City Posse players
Baseball players from California
Sportspeople from Burbank, California
1966 births
Living people